Dave Jackson (1902–1978) was a game warden who lived in the Maine North Woods through the first half of the 20th century.  He was born and raised near the confluence of the Allagash River and Saint John River.  As canoeing became a popular recreational activity he was remembered as the man with the greatest canoe skill on the Allagash Wilderness Waterway.  He routinely took canvas canoes through rapids at the mouth of the Allagash and both upstream and downstream through Big Black Rapids on the Saint John River.

Allagash Plantation
Dave was born 2 September 1902 at Ouellette Farm on the Saint John River.  He was the eldest of six children of David Jackson and Elizabeth (Gardner) Jackson.  The Jackson family owned a farm in Allagash, Maine.  Dave's father farmed the land during the brief summers and assisted logging operations during the remainder of the year.  Dave and his father freighted supplies up the Saint John River in pine pirogues from the Bangor and Aroostook Railroad at Saint Francis, Maine.  Dave left school after the eighth grade to learn log driving before leaving home to work as a timber cruiser for International Paper Company.  He learned from the river drivers how to build a soft mattress of fir boughs to keep his bedding dry above the moist ground or snow.

Umsaskis Lake
In 1929 Dave Jackson was employed as a Maine game warden assigned to live and work out of a small 255-square-foot (24-square-meter) cabin on Umsaskis Lake on the upper Allagash River.  The cabin was one-quarter mile (400 meters) from the unpaved Lacroix road from Lac-Frontière, Quebec and could be reached only on snowshoes for most of the winter.   His patrol area consisted of twenty townships with a combined population of about 3000 living mostly in 50 scattered logging camps.  Patrols lasting up to ten-days were made on snowshoes through the winter months and by canoe or on foot during the summer.   The area had been logged in the early 19th century, and Édouard Lacroix began cutting second-growth hardwood and pulpwood in 1926.  Many of the men working in the logging camps were French Canadians unfamiliar with Maine laws, unable to read English, and accustomed to animal trapping and hunting for food.  Warden Jackson narrowly avoided being hanged by an illegal snare set for deer.  When he arrested poachers, they often had to snowshoe more than 60 miles (100 km) to court.

Dave Jackson was a patient, quiet man not given to argument, bragging, or speaking ill of others.  He came home from one patrol with a bullet hole through his hat, but said nothing of the cause.  He became known as a good, honest, and loyal civil servant who was often called upon to assist lost hunters or upset canoes.  He led a 500-man search for the crew of a crashed Canadian bomber.  Four airmen were rescued as December temperatures dipped to 40 below zero, but the body of the fifth was not discovered until the following spring.

Maine law provided a bounty on bobcat and American black bear at the time, and Jackson was called upon to shoot bears damaging logging camp kitchens.   One bobcat lost a fight with Dave's dog, but regained consciousness as Dave was dragging it back to camp.  Dave killed the 30-pound (14-kg) bobcat by swinging it around by the hind leg until its head hit something solid.

Family
He married Annette Hetu in Jackman, Maine on Easter Sunday 1932.  In 1938 he was promoted to chief warden of the Allagash District and moved back to the family farm at Allagash Plantation where schooling was available for their three children born while they lived on Umsaskis Lake.   Their fourth child was born in 1943.  Warden Jackson retired in 1952; and began spending winters near their daughter while her husband was stationed at Eglin Air Force Base.  He and his wife spent their final years living near their daughter's family in Fort Walton Beach, Florida where he died in 1978.

Notes

References
 

People from Aroostook County, Maine
1902 births
1978 deaths
American male canoeists